Toberaquill is a townland in County Westmeath, Ireland.

Toberaquill is one of 11 townlands of the civil parish of Taghmon in the barony of Corkaree in the Province of Leinster.

The neighbouring townlands are: Monkstown to the north, Clonkill to the east, Loughagar More to the south–east, Brittas to the south, Knockdrin to the south–west and Knockatee to the west and north–west.

In the 1911 census of Ireland there were 9 houses and 44 inhabitants in the townland.

References

External links
Map of Toberaquill at openstreetmap.org
Toberaquill at the IreAtlas Townland Data Base
Toberaquill at Townlands.ie
Toberaquill at The Placenames Database of Ireland

Townlands of County Westmeath